Magnus Andersen (born 28 May 1986) is a Norwegian football midfielder currently playing for Alta in the Norwegian 2. divisjon, the third tier of football in Norway.

Career
Anderson started his career with Øksfjord IL. He represented Norway on U17 and U18 level. He went on to Alta IF, before transferring to Tromsø IL in the 2010/11 winter transfer window. During Tromsø IL's 2011-12 Europa League Qualification, Anderson scored a brace in their first leg, 5-0 thrashing against Latvian club Daugava Daugavpils. He has scored seven total goals in European competitions for Tromsø, making him joint European top scorer for the club together with Ole Martin Årst.

Career statistics

Club

References

External links
 UEFA Profile

1986 births
Living people
People from Loppa
Norwegian Sámi sportspeople
Norwegian footballers
Norway youth international footballers
Alta IF players
Tromsø IL players
Norwegian First Division players
Eliteserien players
Association football midfielders
Sportspeople from Troms og Finnmark